Rohan Narayana Murty is a junior fellow at the Harvard Society of Fellows, founder of the Murty Classical Library of India and founder and chief technical officer of the digital transformation company Soroco, which specialises in automation using artificial intelligence sources.

Background and personal life
Murty is the son of N. R. Narayana Murthy, founder of Infosys, and his wife Sudha Murty, an engineer and author. Shrinivas Kulkarni, a professor of astrophysics and planetary science at California Institute of Technology, is his maternal uncle and is said to have been a major influence on Murty. Murty grew up with a passion for programming. He has an older sister, Akshata Sunak, wife of UK Prime Minister Rishi Sunak.

Murty studied at the Bishop Cotton Boys' School in Bangalore. After completing his twelfth standard board exams, he moved to the US and took an undergraduate degree in Computer Science from Cornell University. This was followed by a PhD in computer engineering from Harvard University, which he obtained in 2011. The subject of his doctoral thesis was opportunistic wireless networks, networks that work by continually seeking and using underused portions of the spectrum, and vacating them if any incumbent returns. His PhD was supported by a Siebel Scholars Fellowship and a Microsoft Research Fellowship.

In June 2011, Murty married Lakshmi Venu, daughter of Venu Srinivasan, CEO of TVS Motors and his wife, Mallika Srinivasan, CEO of TAFE; Murty and Lakshmi divorced by 2015. In December 2019, he married Aparna Krishnan, daughter of former Indian Navy officer K.R. Krishnan and his wife, Savithri Krishnan, a retired employee of SBI.

Corporate career
In June 2013, Murty was appointed as an executive assistant at the Chairman's Office reporting to Narayana Murthy at Infosys, when Narayana Murthy returned to the company. His appointment as Vice President at Infosys was subject to approval by the Indian Ministry of Corporate Affairs. Murty left Infosys on 14 June 2014, when his father stepped down as Executive Chairman. As of 1 June 2013, Murty is said to have owned Infosys shares worth $347 million.

Murty is on leave from being a junior fellow at the Harvard Society of Fellows. He previously had a "shadow role" with Catamaran Ventures, a $127-million venture capital fund headed by N.R.N. Murthy.

Murty Classical Library
Although he does not read Sanskrit, when Murty was a doctoral student of computer science at Harvard, he took a class focussing on Kumarila Bhatta's Shlokavartika, which got him interested in ancient Indian philosophy and sciences.

He is the founder of the Murty Classical Library of India, a continuation of the Clay Sanskrit Library Project headed by Sheldon Pollock. In 2016, he rejected a petition asking that Pollock be removed from the position of chief editor of the Murty Classical Library.

Notes

References

External links
 Rohan Narayana Murty at Harvard University website

1980s births
Living people
Cornell University alumni
Harvard School of Engineering and Applied Sciences alumni
Infosys people
Businesspeople from Bangalore
Harvard Fellows
Year of birth missing (living people)
Murthy family